The John Allen Farm massacre occurred in South Argyle, Washington County, New York on 25 or 26 July 1777 during the advancement of the British Army in the Saratoga Campaign of the American Revolutionary War.  Six members of the John Allen family and two or three slaves loaned to the Allen's were killed by Native Americans attached to General John Burgoyne's British Army. Subsequently, Native Americans led by the warrior Le Loup attacked and killed Jane McCrae in nearby Fort Edward on 27 July; which garnered publicity in newspapers along the eastern seaboard of America and is believed to have helped rally locals to the American patriotic cause.

Events of that Day

On the day they were killed members of the Allen Family and the slaves were harvesting wheat in the fields of the Allen farm approximately 3.3 miles south of the Village of Argyle. As they were gathered for the lunch meal the Native Americans attacked the farm house killing all and taking their scalps. Killed were John Allen, his wife Eva Kilmer Allen, daughters Eva and Elizabeth, baby John, Eva Kilmer Allen's younger sister Catherine Kilmer and African American slaves Tom, Sarah and an unnamed individual.

Memorials

A stone cairn, erected in 1927, near where the Allen Farm house was located is believed to be the final resting spot for those killed. Two nearby New York State Historical markers on Allen Road, off of County Road 49, note the event and a Memorial to the tragedy, dedicated in July 2017 on the 240th anniversary, is in Prospect Hill Cemetery in Argyle.

References

1777 deaths
American Revolutionary War deaths
People of New York (state) in the American Revolution
18th-century American people
People of the Province of New York